Friedrich Wilhelm Voigt (13 February 1849 – 3 January 1922) was a German impostor who, in 1906, masqueraded as a Prussian military officer, rounded up a number of soldiers under his "command", and "confiscated" more than 4,000 marks from a municipal treasury. Although he served two years in prison, he became a folk hero as "the Captain of Köpenick" and was pardoned by Kaiser Wilhelm II.

Early life
Voigt was born in Tilsit, Prussia (now Sovetsk, Kaliningrad Oblast). In 1863, aged 14, he was sentenced to 14 days in prison for theft, which led to his expulsion from school. He learned shoemaking from his father.

Between 1864 and 1891, Voigt was sentenced to prison for a total of 25 years for thefts, forgery and burglary. The longest sentence was a 15-year conviction for an unsuccessful burglary of a court cashier's office. He was released on 12 February 1906.

Voigt drifted from place to place until he went to live with his sister in Rixdorf near Berlin. He was briefly employed by a well-reputed shoemaker until the local police expelled him from Berlin as an undesirable, based solely on the fact that he was an ex-convict, on 24 August 1906. Officially he left for Hamburg, although he remained in Berlin as an unregistered resident.

Captain of Köpenick

On 16 October 1906, Voigt was ready for his next caper. He had purchased parts of used captain's uniforms from different shops and tested their effect on soldiers. He had resigned from the shoe factory ten days previously. He took the uniform out of baggage storage, put it on and went to the local army barracks, stopped four grenadiers and a sergeant on their way back to barracks and told them to come with him and they followed. He dismissed the commanding sergeant to report to his superiors and later commandeered six more soldiers from a shooting range. Then he took a train to Köpenick, east of Berlin, occupied the local city hall with his soldiers and told them to cover all exits. He told the local police to "care for law and order" and to "prevent calls to Berlin for one hour" at the local post office.

He had the treasurer von Wiltberg and mayor Georg Langerhans arrested, citing suspicion of crooked bookkeeping, and confiscated 4002 marks and 37 pfennigs, issuing a receipt for the money signed with his former jail director's name. Then he commandeered two carriages and told the grenadiers to take the arrested men to the Neue Wache in Berlin for interrogation. He told the remaining guards to stand in their places for half an hour and then left for the train station. He later changed into civilian clothes and disappeared.

Unraveling and capture

In the following days, the German press speculated on what had really happened. At the same time the army ran its own investigation. The public seemed to be positively amused by the daring of the culprit.

Voigt was arrested on 26 October 1906 after a former cellmate who knew about Voigt's plans had tipped off the police, hoping for the high reward. On 1 December Voigt was sentenced to four years in prison for forgery, impersonating an officer and wrongful imprisonment. However, much of public opinion was on his side. German Kaiser Wilhelm II pardoned him on 16 August 1908. There are some claims that even the Kaiser was amused by the incident, referring to him as an amiable scoundrel, and being pleased with the authority and feelings of reverence that his military obviously commanded in the general population.

The British press were also amused, seeing it as confirmation of their stereotypes about Germans. In its 27 October 1906 issue, the editors of The Illustrated London News  noted gleefully:
For years the Kaiser has been instilling into his people reverence for the omnipotence of militarism, of which the holiest symbol is the German uniform. Offences against this fetish have incurred condign punishment. Officers who have not considered themselves saluted in due form have drawn their swords with impunity on offending privates.
In that same issue, writer G. K. Chesterton pointed out:
The most absurd part of this absurd fraud (at least, to English eyes) is one which, oddly enough, has received comparatively little comment. I mean the point at which the Mayor asked for a warrant, and the Captain pointed to the bayonets of his soldiery and said, 'These are my authority'. One would have thought anyone would have known that no soldier would talk like that.

Aftermath
Voigt decided to capitalize on his fame. His wax figure appeared in the wax museum in Unter den Linden four days after his release. He appeared in the museum to sign his pictures but public officials banned the appearances on the same day. He appeared in small theatres in a play that depicted his exploit and signed more photographs as the Captain of Köpenick. In spite of the ban he toured in Dresden, Vienna and Budapest in variety shows, restaurants and amusement parks. In 1909, he published a book in Leipzig, How I became the Captain of Köpenick, which sold well. Although his United States tour almost failed because the immigration authorities refused to grant him a visa, he arrived in 1910 via Canada. He also inspired a waxwork in Madame Tussaud's museum in London.

In 1910, he moved to Luxembourg and worked as a waiter and shoemaker. He received a life pension from a rich Berlin dowager. Two years later, he bought a house and retired, but was ruined financially in the post–World War I recession. Voigt died in Luxembourg in 1922. His grave is on the Cimetière Notre-Dame in Luxembourg.

In popular culture
Voigt's exploits became the subject of literary references as early as 1911, when British satirical writer  Saki defined the term "to koepenick" as "to replace an authority by a spurious imitation that would carry just as much weight for the moment as the displaced original" in his short story "Ministers of Grace".

A silent film was made in German in 1926. In 1931, German author Carl Zuckmayer wrote a play about the affair called The Captain of Köpenick, which shifts the focus from the event at Köpenick itself to the prelude, showing how his surroundings and his situation in life had helped Voigt form his plan. An English-language adaptation was written by John Mortimer, and first performed by the National Theatre company at the Old Vic on 9 March 1971 with Paul Scofield in the title role.

Several more films were produced about Wilhelm Voigt, most based on Zuckmayer's play; among them Der Hauptmann von Köpenick (1931); The Captain from Köpenick (1945), starring Albert Bassermann; Der Hauptmann von Köpenick (1956), with Heinz Rühmann; a 1956 U.S. TV adaptation starring Emmett Kelly, the circus clown; the 1960 TV movie Der Hauptmann von Köpenick, featuring Rudolf Platte; and the 1997 TV movie Der Hauptmann von Köpenick, starring Harald Juhnke.

In 1943 the German Air Force mistakenly thought that a bombing attack which had been carried out on Düren, with the bombers then returning, was a diversion, and the bombers were actually heading for the ball-bearing factory at Schweinfurt; when Schweinfurt was not attacked they were concerned about the Leuna synthetic fuel refinery, then the Skoda Works at Pilsen. They scrambled large numbers of fighters everywhere, whose engine noise sounded like an invading force. After the debacle, Head of the Air Force Hermann Göring sent an ironic telegram to all concerned congratulating them on "the successful defence of the fortress of Koepenick". 

The basic line of stageplays and movies was the pitiful catch-22 situation of Voigt trying to earn his living honourably in Berlin: "No residence address – no job. No job – no residence (rented room). No residence – no passport. No passport – getting ousted."

References

External links

 Wilhelm Voigt: Captain von Köpenick (sniggle.net)
 The Captain of Kopenick (koepenickia.de)
 Köpenicki kapten (nukufilm.ee)
 

1849 births
1922 deaths
1906 crimes in Germany
People from Tilsit
Impostors
20th-century German criminals
Shoemakers
People from the Province of Prussia
Burials at Notre-Dame Cathedral, Luxembourg
1900s hoaxes
Confidence tricksters